Asimah is a settlement in Ras Al Khaimah, in the United Arab Emirates (UAE), located on the banks of the Wadi Asimah.

Populated places in the Emirate of Ras Al Khaimah